Long Cane Massacre Site is a historic site located near Troy, McCormick County, South Carolina.  The district encompasses 40 contributing buildings in Mount Carmel.   The site includes a gravestone marking the place where 23 Long Cane settlers were killed in a bloody massacre by the Cherokee on February 1, 1760.

It was listed on the National Register of Historic Places in 1983.

References

Conflict sites on the National Register of Historic Places in South Carolina
Buildings and structures in McCormick County, South Carolina
National Register of Historic Places in McCormick County, South Carolina